This...Is Marcus Canty is the debut extended play by R&B recording artist Marcus Canty.

Development
After finishing fourth on The X Factor USA, Marcus (alongside Chris Rene and Astro) had been signed to Epic Records. He recorded a mild single called "Won't Make a Fool Out of You" for the soundtrack of 2012's Think Like a Man. He later made an official debut single called "In & Out", featuring rapper Wale. Marcus stated that he did not only want to show his R&B style on the album, but he also wanted to "impress the ladies".

Composition
The extended play contains musical elements from artists such as Michael Jackson, Janet Jackson and Usher.

Track listing

2013 EPs
Epic Records albums
Contemporary R&B albums by American artists
Albums produced by the Underdogs (production team)